Charles Moran may refer to:

 Charles Moran (baseball) (1879–1934), Major League Baseball player
 Charles Moran (Australian politician) (1868–1936), member of the Legislative Assembly of Western Australia
 Charles Moran (American politician) (1797–1876), American businessman, jurist, and politician
 Charles Moran (racing driver) (1906–1978), American racecar driver
 Charles Moran (railroad executive) (1811–1895), American businessman and president of the Erie Railroad
 Charley Moran (1878–1949), American sportsman, coach and umpire, in baseball and football

See also
 Charles Wilson, 1st Baron Moran (1882–1977), British physician